Marty Ashley Pevey (born December 25, 1962) is an American professional baseball manager and former Major League catcher and coach. He has been the manager of the Chicago Cubs' Triple-A affiliate, the Iowa Cubs of the International League, since .

Career
After playing collegiately for the Georgia Southern Eagles, he was selected in the 19th round (474th overall) of the 1982 Major League Baseball draft by the Minnesota Twins, but he was released after only two months in the Rookie-level Appalachian League. He resumed his pro career when the St. Louis Cardinals signed him as a free agent the following season.

Pevey's playing career lasted for 13 seasons (through 1995, with the exception of 1990, which he missed with an injury). In his only Major League trial, he appeared in 13 games played, 11 as a starting catcher, for the  Montreal Expos.  He had one double and one triple among his nine big-league hits.

As a manager, Pevey has worked at all levels of minor league baseball, starting in the Toronto Blue Jays' organization at the Rookie level (Medicine Hat Blue Jays), then moving up the ladder to "low" Class A (Hagerstown Suns), "high" Class A (Dunedin Blue Jays), Double-A (the Eastern League's New Haven Ravens) and Triple-A (the International League's Syracuse Sky Chiefs).

Pevey interrupted his managerial career in 1999 to serve as bullpen coach on the Major League staff of Toronto manager Jim Fregosi.  At the end of the  season, he returned to the MLB Jays when was named Toronto's first base coach, replacing Ernie Whitt, who returned to the bench coach position after serving as both bench coach and first base coach for most of the season. Pevey coached third base for the Blue Jays in 2008 when he was fired along with manager John Gibbons (then in his first term as Toronto's pilot) on June 20, 2008.

In 2009, he joined the Cubs' farm system as manager of the Class A Peoria Chiefs, then worked for three seasons (2010–2012) as the Cubs' minor league catching coordinator. In 2013, his first as pilot of the Iowa Cubs, Pevey led them to a 66–78 record and third place in their division.  Through 13 minor league seasons, Pevey's teams have compiled an 864–829 (.510) mark.  He is the third manager in Iowa Cubs history to serve three or more consecutive seasons as the club's manager and, as of 2016, the fourth-winningest pilot in the franchise's 47-year history.

References

External links
, or Retrosheet, or The Baseball Gauge, or Pura Pelota (Venezuelan Winter League)

1962 births
Living people
Arkansas Travelers players
American expatriate baseball players in Canada
Baseball coaches from Georgia (U.S. state)
Baseball players from Savannah, Georgia
Elizabethton Twins players
Georgia Southern Eagles baseball players
Georgia Southern University alumni
Indianapolis Indians players
Iowa Cubs managers
Jacksonville Suns players
Leones del Caracas players
American expatriate baseball players in Venezuela
Louisville Redbirds players
Macon Redbirds players
Major League Baseball bullpen coaches
Major League Baseball catchers
Major League Baseball first base coaches
Major League Baseball third base coaches
Montreal Expos players
St. Petersburg Cardinals players
Syracuse Chiefs managers
Tacoma Rainiers players
Toledo Mud Hens players
Toronto Blue Jays coaches